46 Cancri is a star in the zodiac constellation of Cancer, located around 680 light years away from the Sun. It is a dim, yellow-hued star, near the lower limits of visibility to the naked eye with an apparent visual magnitude of 6.12. The star is moving closer to the Earth with a heliocentric radial velocity of –13.1 km/s. It has a stellar classification of G5 III, matching an aging giant star that has consumed the hydrogen at its core and evolved away from the main sequence.

46 Cancri is 740 million years old with 2.65 times the mass of the Sun. It has expanded to about 11 times the Sun's radius and is radiating 125.9 times the Sun's luminosity from its enlarged photosphere at an effective temperature of 4,966 K.

References

G-type giants
Cancer (constellation)
Durchmusterung objects
Cancri, 46
074485
042954
3464